The National Archive of Torre do Tombo is the Portuguese national archive located in the civil parish of Alvalade, in the municipality of central-northern Lisbon. Established in 1378, it was renamed the Instituto dos Arquivos Nacionais (Institute of the National Archives) in 2009.

History

The archive is one of the oldest institutions in Portugal, since its installation in one of the towers of the castle in Lisbon, occurring during the reign of Ferdinand I, and likely in 1378 (the date where the first testimony originated). The archive served as the King's and nobilities' reference, with documents supporting the administration of the kingdom and overseas territories, and documenting the relationships between the State and foreign kingdoms.

Following the events of the 1755 Lisbon earthquake, the High-Guardian of the archives, Manuel da Maia, was responsible for saving the contents of the Torre do Tombo. At 75 years old, Maia personally led the safe-guarding team to São Jorge Castle, where the archives were located, and saved nearly 90,000 pieces, accumulated between 1161 and 1696. He ordered the construction of provisional barracks to store the contents of the archives and immediately made a request to Sebastião José de Carvalho e Melo, King Joseph I’s prime-minister, for a new permanent home for the archives, which would eventually be granted to him in the form of the Convent of São Bento (which now houses the parliament of Portugal).

In 1982, a public tender was issued for the construction of the new Torre do Tombo archive building, and was won by the Ateliers Associados, represented by Arsénio Raposo Cordeiro, with M. Sheppard Cruz and A.N. de Almeida.  The cornerstone was laid in 1985, in an official ceremony. The sculptor José Aurélio was invited to sculpt the gargoyles in 1987, which completed between 1988-1990 (in conjunction with mason José Rodrigues and builder Júlio Mesão.
The actual building was projected by architect Arsénio Cordeiro, in collaboration with architect António Barreiros Ferreira. It was inaugurated in 1990, and purposely built to receive the National Archive, whose vast collection had been archived since 1757 in the Monastery of São Bento da Saúde (today the São Bento Palace. The new archive inherited the name of the former Moorish tower of the Castle of São Jorge where documents from the kingdom were warehoused since 1378.

Before its inauguration on 21 December 1990, the archive that remained at the former-monastery was transferred to the new building.
On 22 December 2010, the DRCLVTejo proposed classifying the building as a municipal property of interest, which was supported by the director of the IGESPAR. On 17 May 2011, an announcement was published regarding the process to classify the building, and by August, a formal request to make the building a municipal property of interest was formalized by DRCLVTejo. The National Council for Culture decided on 10 October 2011, that a classification was warranted, and provided their support. On 30 November 2011, a decision on the classification of this building was approved, and a Special Protection Zone was established.

Architecture

The imposing structure consists of two large units unified by a central body, forming an immense "H" plan. The two wings are supported by large bases that create a fortress-like structure, evocative of the large historic monuments that were constructed to last for an eternity, and to act as a symbols of preservation and guardianship of a collective memory. The building occupies an area of  distributed over seven floors, with three floors used by technical rooms, reading rooms, an auditorium and exposition halls. The upper floors are used to shelter the  shelves for documents, with austere cement walls, with small, square fenestrations, that characterizes a safe-box.
Erected in the centre of each facade is a vertical body that acts as buttress, in the form of a "T" that reproduces the archives initials for "Torre do Tombo". The principal and rear facades (oriented to the south and north respectively) are surmounted by eight gargoyles, sculpted by José Aurélio, representing fundamentals elements from human history or important in the particular mission of the national archive. These include gargoyles that figure as the Guarda do Abecedário (Guard of the Alphabet), the Guarda das Ondas Hertzianas (Guard of Hertzian Waves), O Velho (The Old) and o Novo (The Young), the a Morte (The Death) and O Bem (The Good) and O Mal (The Evil); the gargoyles in the rear represent A Tragédia (The Tragedy) and A Comédia (The Comedy), A Guerra (The War) and A Paz (The Peace), the Guarda das Pedras (Guard of Stones) and the Guarda dos Papiros (Guard of Papyruses or Guard of the Scrolls).

Collections

The Torre do Tombo safeguards twelve centuries of historical Portuguese guards, including documents that pre-date the Kingdom of Portugal, and others like the bull Manifestis Probatum, considered an important of UNESCO World Heritage. In addition, records include 36,000 documents recovered during the era of the Inquisition, many documents inscribed by the Nationlist police force (PIDE) and the accord admitted Portugal into the European Economic Community.

Among the other significant collections at the archive are items relating to the Portuguese explorations and discoveries in Africa, Asia and Latin America. The Corpo Cronológico (Chronological Body), a collection of manuscripts on the Portuguese discoveries, was inscribed on UNESCO's Memory of the World Register in 2007 in recognition of its historical value "for acquiring knowledge of the political, diplomatic, military, economic and religious history of numerous countries at the time of the Portuguese Discoveries."  Another item relating to the Portuguese discoveries, the Carta de Pêro Vaz de Caminha (Letter from Pêro Vaz de Caminha), was also inscribed on the Memory of the World Register in 2005.  This letter is the first document describing the land and people of what became Brazil.

See also 

 List of archives in Portugal
 Biblioteca Nacional de Portugal (National Library)
 List of national archives

References

Notes

Sources
 
 
 

Torre Tombo

Culture in Lisbon
Portugal
Archives in Portugal
Torre Tombo